The Legion of Merit was a Rhodesian order of merit awarded to both civilian and military recipients for service to Rhodesia.

Institution 
The award was instituted in 1970 by Presidential Warrant, the first awards being made the same year. The last awards were made in June 1980.  The civil class was suspended from a green and gold ribbon.  The military class differed by featuring a red stripe on the green and gold ribbon.

Classes
There were five classes of the order:
Grand Commander (GCLM)
Grand Officer (GLM)
Commander (CLM)
Officer (OLM)
Member (MLM)

The incumbent President of Rhodesia served as Grand Master of the Legion of Merit. Recipients of the order were entitled to the post-nominal letters indicated above. It was retained by the government of Zimbabwe-Rhodesia as well, the President of that state also serving as Grand Master.

Zimbabwe

The Legion of Merit was superseded in April 1981 by the Zimbabwe Order of Merit, which is awarded to civilians as well as military personnel for eminent achievement and services to Zimbabwe.

Notable recipients

While the higher grades of the order were used almost exclusively by Ian Smith's Rhodesian Front government to reward political service, recipients of the lower and middle grades included a number of notable military leaders, community leaders and civil servants.

Grand Commanders 
There were only 5 GCLMs:

No GCLMs were ever awarded in the Military Division.

Grand Officers 
There were 28 GLMs (Civil Division):

Commanders 

There were 32 CLMs (Civil Division) and 4 CLMs (Military Division).

Others 
There were 126 OLMs (Civil Division).

There were 35 OLMs (Military Division) and 10 OLMs (Military Division) (Combatant).

There were 300 MLMs (Civil Division), 55 MLMs (Military Division) and 10 MLMs (Military Division) (Combatant).

References

External links
Orders, Medals and Decorations of Zimbabwe and Rhodesia
Image on medals.org.uk

Orders, decorations, and medals of Rhodesia
Awards established in 1970
1970 establishments in Rhodesia